Skin Creek is a stream in the U.S. state of West Virginia.

Some believe the stream was named for an incident when animal pelts were washed away during a flood, while others believe a successful hunt near the creek accounts for the name.

See also
List of rivers of West Virginia

References

Rivers of Lewis County, West Virginia
Rivers of West Virginia